KF Veleshta (FK Veleshta) is a football club based in the village of Veleshtë, Struga, North Macedonia. They are currently competing in the Macedonian Third League (Southwest Division).

History
The club was founded in 1956.

The biggest achievement of the club was a playing in the Macedonian Second League.

In 2014–15 season they played play-off for qualifying in Macedonian Second League but they lost in two matches vs Ljubanci (4–1 and 3–0).
In year 2020 kf veleshta reached their achievement by competing in the second macedonian football league
by winning play-off qualifying round vs besa 1976 [3-1].

Current squad
As of 12 July 2021.

References

External links
Veleshta Facebook 
Club info at MacedonianFootball 
Football Federation of Macedonia 

Veleshta
Association football clubs established in 1956
1956 establishments in the Socialist Republic of Macedonia
FK
Veleshta